An Advent calendar is used to count the days of Advent in anticipation of Christmas. Since the date of the First Sunday of Advent varies, falling between November 27 and December 3 inclusive, many reusable Advent calendars made of paper or wood begin on December 1. Others start from the First Sunday of Advent and thus include the last few days of November that begin the liturgical season of Advent. 

The Advent calendar was first used by German Lutherans in the 19th and 20th centuries, and has since then spread to other Christian denominations.

Design and use

Traditional Advent calendars feature the manger scene, Saint Nicholas and winter weather, while others range in theme, from sports to technology. They come in a multitude of forms, from a simple paper calendar with flaps covering each of the days to fabric pockets on a background scene to painted wooden boxes with cubby holes for small items.  

Many Advent calendars take the form of a large rectangular card with "Doors", one for each day of December leading up to and including Christmas Eve (December 24) or Christmas Day (December 25). Consecutive doors are opened every day leading up to Christmas, beginning on the start of the Advent season for that year, or simply on December 1, as is the case of reusable Advent calendars. 

Often the doors are distributed across the calendar in no particular order. The calendar doors open to reveal an image, a poem, a portion of a story (such as the story of the Nativity of Jesus), or a small gift, such as a toy or a chocolate item. Often, each door has a Bible verse and Christian prayer printed on it, which Christians incorporate as part of their daily Advent devotions. 

There are many variations of Advent calendars; some European villages create advent calendars on buildings or even so-called "living" Advent calendars, where different windows are decorated for each day of Advent.

The Nordic Julekalender/Julkalender

In Denmark, Finland, Iceland, Norway and Sweden, there is a tradition of having a  Julekalender (Swedish: Julkalender, Finnish: Joulukalenteri, Icelandic: Jóladagatal; the local word for a Yule—or Christmas—calendar) in the form of a television or radio show, starting on December 1 and ending on Christmas Eve (December 24).

The first such show aired on radio in 1957 in the form of the Swedish radio series Barnens adventskalender. The first televised show of the genre aired in 1960 in the form of the Swedish program Titteliture. The first julekalender aired in Denmark was Historier fra hele verden in 1962. The televised julkalender or julekalendar has now extended into the other Nordic countries. In Finland, for example, the show is called Joulukalenteri.

Over the years, there have been several kinds of julekalender. Some are directed at children, some at both children and adults, and some directed at adults alone. There is a Julkalender radio show in Sweden, which airs in the days leading up to Christmas. A classic example of a julekalender enjoyed by children, as well as adults, if purely for nostalgic reasons, is the 1979 Norwegian television show Jul i Skomakergata. Another is the 1990 Icelandic television show Á baðkari til Betlehem.

Image gallery

See also

 Advent candle
 Advent wreath
 Christingle
 Lenten calendar

References

External links
 
 

Christmas in Germany
German inventions
Calendar
History of Lutheranism
Chocolate
Calendars